David Brown (17 August 1803 in Aberdeen – 3 July 1897 in Aberdeen) was a son of bookseller who was twice Provost of the city. He was a Free Church of Scotland minister who served as Moderator of the General Assembly 1885/86. He was co-author of the Jamieson-Fausset-Brown Commentary on the whole Bible.

Life
He was born in Aberdeen in 1803 the fourth son of Alexander Brown, a bookseller, and twice Lord Provost of Aberdeen, and his wife, Catharine Chalmers. He was educated at Aberdeen Grammar School. He studied Divinity at Aberdeen University graduating in 1821. He was licensed to preach in 1826  then went to London for two years to work with Edward Irving. 

He returned to Scotland in 1829 to assist in the ministry at Dumbarton. Emerging from a period of doubt which accompanied his studies, he became a probationer in the Church of Scotland and assistant to the celebrated Edward Irving in London, 1830-32. In 1835 he became minister of Ord, Banffshire in the Presbytery of Fordyce, Aberdeenshire.

In the Disruption of 1843 he left the Church of Scotland and became minister of Free St. James, Glasgow, and professor of theology at Free Church College of the University of Aberdeen. He was co-author of the Jamieson-Fausset-Brown Commentary (1871) with Robert Jamieson, St. Paul's, Glasgow and the Rev. A. R. Fausset, St. Cuthbert's, York, England. He was a director of the National Bible Society of Scotland, the Evangelical Alliance and the Alliance of the Reformed Churches.

He was succeeded as Moderator by Rev Alexander Neill Somerville.

He died at home, 104 Crown Street in Aberdeen on 3 July 1897.

Family
He  married  Catherine  (died  30  July  1879, aged  75),  third  daughter  of  William  Dyce, M.D.,  Aberdeen,  and  Margaret  Chalmers, on 25 February 1836 at Saint Nicholas's Church, Aberdeen, Scotland. and  had  issue  —
Margaret  Dyce  (married 1860  Sir  David  Stewart  of  Banchory, Lord  Provost  of  Aberdeen from 1889 to 1894.)
Alexander, I.C.S.,  died  1861
David  Dyce,  M.D., London,  born  30  August  1840
Catherine Hannah
Jane  Charlotte  (married  James Fyfe,  merchant, Manila)
Meredith  Jemima, Head  of  Shaftesbury  Institute,  London, died  8  November  1908.

His younger brother was Charles John Brown.

Works
 Christ's Second Coming: Will it be Premillennial? Edinburgh, 1846.
Watchman,  what  of  the  Sight? (Edinburgh,  1855)
To  Whom  shall  We  Go? (Aberdeen,  1857)
On  United  and  Universal Prayers  (Edinburgh,  1860)
Commentary  on the  Epistle  to  the  Romans  (Glasgow,  1860)
The  Restoration  of  the  Jews: the History, Principles, and Bearings of the Question  (Edinburgh, 1861)
Crushed  Hopes  crowned  in  Death (London,  1861) in memory of his son, Alexander Brown, (d. 1860) London, 1861.
The  Union  Question  (Edinburgh, 1867)
A  Commentary  on  the  Old and New  Testaments  [with  Robert  Jamieson, D.D.,  and  Andrew  Robert  Fausset,  D.D.], vols.  v.  and  vi.  (Glasgow,  1868-70)
Life  of the late John Duncan (1796–1870),  LLD.  (Edinburgh,  1872)
The  Apocalypse :  Its  Structure  and  Primary Predictions  (London,  1891). 
 Gospels, Acts of the Apostles, and Epistle to the Romans in R. Jamieson and A. R. Fausset Commentary, Critical, Experimental, and Practical, on the Old and New Testaments 6 vols. Glasgow, 1864–70.
 Commentary on the Epistles to the Corinthians in Philip Schaff Popular Commentary on the New Testament, 1882.
 Epistle to the Romans Dods and Whyte's Handbooks for Bible Classes, Edinburgh, 1883.

Bibliography

In  Memoriam,  1897
Guthrie's  Chalmers  and  Trail  Ancestry, 25,  85,  144
Boase's  English  Biography,  iv.,  510
Who was  Who?  93.

References

Citations

Sources

See also

1803 births
1897 deaths
Clergy from Aberdeen
19th-century Ministers of the Free Church of Scotland
19th-century Scottish writers
Alumni of the University of Aberdeen
Academics of the University of Aberdeen
19th-century Calvinist and Reformed theologians